Yakacık is a neighborhood of Kartal district in Istanbul Province.

Transport
Metro
M4 Kadıköy-Tavşantepe (extension to Sabiha Gökçen International Airport is under construction)

References

Populated places in Istanbul Province
Neighbourhoods of Istanbul
Kartal